The ARP 16-Voice Electric Piano was a 73 key electronic piano produced by ARP Instruments, Inc. from 1979 to 1981, with a specially designed weighted maple action keys, similar to a grand piano. There was also a headphone jack on the front panel and two inputs on the back for external inputs such as tape recorders etc. can be played along to.

Sounds
 Acoustic piano
 Vibes
 Harpsichord
 Harp
 Electric piano

Pedal assembly
The unit featured two brass pedals, right for sustain, left soft pedal or vibrato.

External links
http://synthmuseum.com/arp/arppianobro.jpg

References 

ARP synthesizers
Analog synthesizers
Electric pianos